This article concerns the period 659 BC – 650 BC.

Events and trends
Occupation begins at Maya site of Piedras Negras, Guatemala.
First evidence of written Olmec language from the New World.  Pyramid building continues.
657 BC—Cypselus becomes the first tyrant of Corinth.
657 BC—The Li Ji Unrest is a series of events from 657BC to 651BC that takes place during the Spring and Autumn Period, caused by Li Ji, the concubine of Duke Xian of Jin, in order to put his son Xiqi onto the throne of Jin.
656 BC—Psamtik I extends his control over all of Egypt. End of Twenty-fifth Dynasty.
653 BC—Atta-Khumma-In-Shushinak and Khumbanigash II succeed Shilhak-In-Shushinak and Tempti-Khumma-In-Shushinak as kings of the Elamite Empire.
652 BC—Babylonia rises in revolt under Shamash-shum-ukin against the Assyrians.
652 BC—Guan Zhong urges the Duke of Qi to maintain the respect of the other states by refusing the offer of the son of a recently defeated state's ruler to ally himself with Qi if Qi would help him depose his father.
651 BC—King Xiang of Zhou becomes King of the Zhou Dynasty of China.
650 BC—The town of Abdera in Thrace is founded by colonists from Clazomenae.
 First evidence of writing in the New World, among the Olmec Winters, C.A. (1984a). Blacks in ancient America. ColorLines, 3(2), 27–28.
650 BC—A climate change affects all the Bronze Age cultures in Europe with colder and wetter climate, and tribes from the Scandinavian Nordic Bronze Age cultures are pushed downwards into the European continent.
650 BC–625 BC—Wine pitcher (oinochoe), from Rhodes, is made. It is now at Museum of Fine Arts, Boston.

Significant people
 653 BC—Death of Tantamani, last king of the Twenty-fifth Dynasty of Egypt
 652 BC—Death of Zhou hui wang, king of the Zhou Dynasty of China
 652 BC—First recorded mention of King Kuras of Parsumas, possibly the same as King Cyrus I of Anshan, head of the Achaemenid dynasty

References